Tiruchendur taluk is a taluk of Thoothukudi district of the Indian state of Tamil Nadu. The headquarters of the taluk is the town of Tiruchendur.

Demographics
According to the 2011 census, the taluk of Tiruchendur had a population of 308,892 with 151,137  males and 157,755 females. There were 1044 women for every 1000 men. The taluk had a literacy rate of 81.83. Child population in the age group below 6 was 15,709 Males and 15,095 Females.

References 

Taluks of Thoothukudi district